Teig Wilton (born 25 September 1999) is a professional rugby league footballer who plays as a  forward for the Cronulla-Sutherland Sharks in the NRL.

Background
Wilton played his junior rugby league for the Narooma Devils in the Group 16 Rugby League.

He is the nephew of former Cronulla-Sutherland Sharks coach John Morris.

Early career

2020
Wilton made his first grade debut in round 11 of the 2020 NRL season for Cronulla against the St. George Illawarra Dragons.

2021
In round 4 of the 2021 NRL season, he scored his first try in the top grade for Cronulla in a 48-10 victory over North Queensland at Kogarah Oval.
Wilton played 15 games for Cronulla in the 2021 NRL season which saw the club narrowly miss the finals by finishing 9th on the table.

2022
Wilton played a total of 24 games for Cronulla in the 2022 NRL season scoring four tries.  Wilton played in both of Cronulla's finals matches as they were eliminated in straight sets losing to North Queensland and South Sydney.

Statistics

NRL
 Statistics are correct as of the end of the 2022 season

References

External links
Sharks profile

1999 births
Living people
Australian rugby league players
Cronulla-Sutherland Sharks players
Rugby league players from New South Wales
Rugby league second-rows